Altnaharra  is a small hamlet in Sutherland in the Highland region of northern Scotland. The hamlet is on the A836 road, close to its junction with the B873. The nearest villages are Lairg and Tongue. Lochs in the area include Loch Naver and Loch Eriboll.

The name Altnaharra is derived from the Scottish Gaelic Allt na h-Eirbhe, meaning Stream at the boundary wall. This is named after a stream that flows through the hamlet.

Altnaharra is one of only two British locations where the String sedge plant can be found. The area north of the hamlet has been designated a site of special scientific interest for its 'internationally important range of wetland vegetation'.

Buildings
Altnaharra is famous for the Altnaharra Hotel, which opened in 1820 and quickly became a popular place for anglers to stay while visiting nearby lochs. The hotel was also popular with mountain climbers; it generally closes for winter and re-opens in March. Ben Hope and Ben Klibreck are two mountains in the immediate area of the hamlet.

Altnaharra parish church was built between 1854–1857 by Hugh Mackay as a Free Church. It subsequently became part of the Church of Scotland, but no regular services are presently conducted in the building.  Altnaharra is now part of the parish of Altnaharra and Farr, served by the church at Strathnaver.

Weather station
Altnaharra has a Met Office weather station. The village's northerly latitude and inland location mean that in winter it often features in the daily weather extremes for the United Kingdom. It is unusual in that the coldest month of the year is normally December. On 30 December 1995, the UK's lowest recorded temperature  was measured there. This matched recordings at Braemar in the Grampians on 11 February 1895 and on 10 January 1982. In a Parliamentary debate on the Spring Statement on 23 March 2022, local MP Jamie Stone said, "The village of Altnaharra in my constituency is the coldest place in the UK every single winter."

On 19 June 2020, the station had both the warmest temperature, and the coldest temperature, reported anywhere in the United Kingdom on that day. The March 2009 temperature was beaten on 25 March 2017 when the station recorded . On 24 September 2020, Altnaharra reported  which was the lowest reported September temperature at this station, as well as being the coldest in the UK since 1997.

Altnaharra has an oceanic climate (Cfb) with short, mild summers and long, cool winters. Precipitation occurs regularly year round.

Notable persons
Linda Norgrove, kidnapped by the Taliban in Afghanistan, and killed by a US grenade during a rescue effort, was born at Altnaharra.

References

External links
Met Office – Altnaharra: latest observations
Altnaharra Hotel
 

Populated places in Sutherland
Parish of Farr